Aristae is the plural form of arista. It may refer to:

Arista (insect anatomy), part of an insect antenna
Arista (botany), an awn